The Confederate State of North Carolina issued currency during the years 1861, 1862, 1863 and 1864.  The most recent state currency issue prior to this were the Colonial American banknotes issued during the 18th century.  Many North Carolina banks also issued currency during this period.

Many of the North Carolina banknotes are similar to period issues from other Confederate States; this is not surprising, as the North Carolina banknotes were printed by many of the same printers that were used by other states.

It is estimated that the printing of approximately $11,350,000 in banknotes was authorized over the four-year period, but it is unknown how much was actually printed and put into circulation.

Denominations
The North Carolina banknote issues are generally divided by year, and are represented by the following denominations:

1861 Notes
 5 cents
The 5 cent bill from 1861 was among the smallest denomination bills printed during the confederacy of North Carolina.  It was also one of the smallest physical bills, measuring approximately 3" by 1 5/8".. By 1863 barter was replacing currency and a tenpenny nail was used in place of this note.

Text on the note
By Authority of Law. (left margin)

Raleigh, Oct. 1st, 1861.

TheState of North CarolinaWill pay to Bearer, at the Treasury, on or
before Jan'y 1st, 1866,FIVE CENTS.J. Spelman, Public Printer.

(signed) For Pub. Treas.

Receivable in Payment of All Public Dues. (right margin)

Varieties
All of the 1861 North Carolina fractionals are known to exist with and without plate marks A and B (appearing above the word Carolina''''').  Various paper and watermark combinations exist, as are bills printed on the backs of bonds and other denominations of notes.

Serial numbers and signatures
Known serial number / serial combinations include:
 1042 A - S. H. Young
 5289 - S. H. Young
 79301 - Henry Hardie
 79344 - Henry Hardie

Other 1861 denominations

 10 cents
 20 cents
 25 cents
 50 cents
 1 dollar (NC Institute Deaf & Dumb)
 1 dollar (No Printer)
 2 dollars (NC Institute Deaf & Dumb)
 2 dollars (Bornemann)

1862 Notes
 10 cents
 25 cents
 50 cents
 1 dollar
 5 dollars
 10 dollars
 20 dollars
 50 dollars
 100 dollars

1863 Notes
 5 cents
 10 cents
 25 cents
 50 cents
 75 cents
 1 dollar
 2 dollar
 3 dollar
 5 dollars
 10 dollars
 20 dollars
 50 dollars

1864 Notes
 25 cents
 50 cents

References

Confederate States of America currency
1861 establishments in North Carolina
Currencies introduced in 1861